The Mizoram women's football team is an Indian women's football team representing Mizoram in the Senior Women's National Football Championship. They made their maiden Senior Women's National Football Championship semi-final appearance at the 2021–22 edition against the eventual runners-up Railways, but lost in the penalty shootout.

Mizoram's sub-junior team were the champions of the National Sub-Junior Girls’ Football tournament held in 2015 held at Cuttack.

Honours
 Sub–Junior Girl's National Football Championship
 Winners (1): 2014–15

References

Football in Mizoram
Women's football teams in India